The Moreton Bay Local Heritage Register is a heritage register containing a list of culturally-significant places within the Moreton Bay Region, Queensland, Australia. Under Section 113 of the Queensland Heritage Act 1992, all local government authorities in Queensland must maintain a local heritage register.

The Moreton Bay Regional Council maintains its local heritage register in two parts:

 List of sites, objects and buildings of significant historical and cultural value
 List of significant trees

List of sites, objects and buildings of significant historical and cultural value

References 

Local heritage registers in Queensland